Mantophasma zephyra is a species of insect in the family Mantophasmatidae. It is endemic to Namibia.

References

Mantophasmatidae
Insects of Namibia
Endemic fauna of Namibia
Insects described in 2002